Going Public is Beach Boys member Bruce Johnston's third solo album, and the only one recorded (as of 2021) after becoming a member of The Beach Boys. It was released in May 1977 under Columbia Records.

Track listing
All tracks composed and arranged by Bruce Johnston; except where indicated
 "I Write the Songs" – 4:05
 "Deirdre" (Johnston, Brian Wilson) – 4:10
 "Thank You, Baby" – 4:23
 "Rendezvous" (Johnston, Bill Hudson, Brett Hudson, Mark Hudson) – 2:27
 "Won't Somebody Dance with Me" (Lynsey De Paul) – 4:01
 "Disney Girls" – 5:09
 "Rock and Roll Survivor" – 2:54
 "Don't Be Scared" – 3:08
 "Pipeline" (Brian Carman, Bob Spickard; arranged by John Hobbs) – 4:36

Personnel
 Bruce Johnston – lead vocals, piano, keyboards, bass guitar, guitar,  arrangements of backing vocals
 Bob Alcivar – horn and string arrangements
 Michael Anthony – acoustic guitar
 Curt Boettcher (as Curt Becher) – backing vocals, arrangements of backing vocals
 Harry Betts – string arrangement on "Won't Somebody Dance with Me"
 California Boys Choir – backing vocals on "I Write the Songs", arranged by Douglas Neslund
 Ed Carter – acoustic guitar
 Joe Chemay – bass guitar, backing vocals
 Kathy Dragon – flute
 John Hobbs – guitar, piano
 Igor Horoshevsky – cello
 Jon Joyce – cello, backing vocals
 Gary Mallaber – drums
 Caleb Quaye – electric guitar
 Chad Stuart – acoustic guitar
 Richie Zito – electric guitar
Cindy Bullens, Jim Haas, Brent Nelson, Diana Lee, Gary Puckett - backing vocals

References

1977 albums
Bruce Johnston albums
Albums produced by Gary Usher
Columbia Records albums